David Blain Huppert (born April 17, 1957) is an American former professional baseball catcher in Major League Baseball (MLB) and former manager of the Lakeland Flying Tigers of Minor League Baseball's Florida State League (FSL) in the Detroit Tigers organization.

Playing career
He caught 31 of 33 innings on April 18, 1981, for the Rochester Red Wings against the Pawtucket Red Sox in the longest game in professional baseball history.

He appeared in a total of 15 games, he collected one hit—a single against Joe Niekro.

Managerial career
He went on to work in the farm systems of the Milwaukee Brewers (1986–91), Chicago White Sox (1993–98), Florida Marlins (1999–2001), Montreal Expos (2002–04), Philadelphia Phillies (2006–10) and Detroit Tigers (since 2011).

For the Expos, he was the manager of the Double-A Harrisburg Senators for one year (2002), and  the Triple-A Edmonton Trappers for two years (2003–04).

He replaced Steve Smith as Philadelphia's third-base coach during Smith's two-game suspension in September 2008.

In December 2010, Huppert was hired to manage the Lakeland Flying Tigers. Huppert spent the next six seasons managing the Flying Tigers, 2016 was his final season in this role.

Though 2016 and 28 seasons as a minor-league skipper, Huppert posted a managerial record of 1,909–1,831 (.510). He recorded winning records 15 times in those 28 seasons, earning playoff berths 12 times. Huppert managed teams to league titles four times: the  Florida State League (Advanced-A) co-champion Brevard County Manatees, the 2006 South Atlantic League (Low-A) champion Lakewood BlueClaws, the  Florida State League champion Clearwater Threshers and the  Florida State League champion Lakeland Flying Tigers.

References

External links

1957 births
Living people
American expatriate baseball players in Canada
Baltimore Orioles players
Baseball coaches from California
Baseball players from California
Birmingham Barons managers
Bluefield Orioles players
Charlotte O's players
El Paso Diablos players
Hagerstown Suns players
Lehigh Valley IronPigs managers
Major League Baseball catchers
Major League Baseball third base coaches
Miami Orioles players
Milwaukee Brewers players
People from South Gate, California
Philadelphia Phillies coaches
Rochester Red Wings players
Toledo Mud Hens players
Vancouver Canadians players